The Chandler River is a  stream in the U.S. state of Alaska, whose source is Chandler Lake in the Gates of the Arctic National Park.

See also
List of rivers of Alaska

References 

Rivers of Alaska